is a single by Japanese boy band SMAP. It was released on December 18, 2013. It debuted in number one on the weekly Oricon Singles Chart and reached number one on the Billboard Japan Hot 100. It was the 25th best-selling single of 2014 in Japan, with 250,616 copies.

References 

2013 singles
2013 songs
Billboard Japan Hot 100 number-one singles
Oricon Weekly number-one singles